The 2018–19 Svenska Cupen was the 63rd season of the Svenska Cupen and the seventh season with the current format. The winners of the competition will secure a spot in the second qualifying round of the 2019–20 UEFA Europa League, unless they had already qualified for European competition in the 2019–20 season, in which case the qualification spot will go to fourth-placed team of the 2018 Allsvenskan. A total of 96 clubs will enter the competition, 64 teams from district sites and 32 from the Allsvenskan and the Superettan.

The first rounds will be played between 15 May and 4 July 2018. The first round draw was announced on 25 April 2018. Times up to 27 October 2018 and from 31 March 2019 are CEST (UTC+2). Times from 28 October 2018 to 30 March 2019 are CET (UTC+1).

Round and draw dates
The schedule of the competition is as follows.

Teams

Round 1

64 teams from the third tier or lower of the Swedish league system competed in this round.

Round 2
64 teams will compete in this round.  32 winners from Round 1, and all 32 teams from the 2018 Allsvenskan and the 2018 Superettan. The draw was held on July 7, 2018 with games scheduled to be played on August 21–23, 2018.

Group stage
The 32 winners from round 2 were divided into eight groups of four teams. The 16 highest ranked winners from the previous rounds were seeded to the top two positions in each group and the 16 remaining winners were unseeded in the draw. The ranking of the 16 seeded teams was decided by league position in the 2018 season. All teams in the group stage will play each other once, the highest ranked teams from the previous rounds and teams from tier three or lower will have the right to play two home matches.

Qualified teams

Seeded
AIK (1)
BK Häcken (1)
Dalkurd FF (1)
Djurgårdens IF (1)
IF Brommapojkarna (1)
IFK Göteborg (1)
IFK Norrköping (1)
Hammarby IF (1)
IF Elfsborg (1)
IK Sirius (1)
Malmö FF (1)
Örebro SK (1)
Östersunds FK (1)
AFC Eskilstuna (2)
Falkenbergs FF (2)
Örgryte IS (2)

Unseeded
Degerfors IF (2)
GAIS (2)
Halmstads BK (2)
IFK Värnamo (2)
IK Brage (2)
IK Frej (2)
Jönköpings Södra IF (2)
Norrby IF (2)
Varbergs BoIS (2)
Östers IF (2)
Eskilsminne IF (3)
Nyköpings BIS (3)
Assyriska IK (4)
FC Rosengård (4)
Hässleholms IF (4)
Karlstad BK (4)

Group 1

Group 2

Group 3

Group 4

Group 5

Group 6

Group 7

Group 8

Knockout stage

Qualified teams

Bracket

Quarter-finals

Semi-finals

Final

References

Svenska Cupen seasons
Cupen
Cupen
Sweden